Elizabeth Barlow may refer to:
Elizabeth Berlay or Barlow (died 1518), English courtier and wife of Lord Elphinstone
Bess of Hardwick ( 1527–1608), married name Elizabeth Barlow, influential courtier during the reign of Elizabeth I of England
Elizabeth Barlow Rogers (born 1936), American landscape designer and author